John H. Wills (born February 18, 1966) is an American politician serving as a member of the Iowa House of Representatives from the 10th district. Elected in November 2014, Wills assumed office on January 12, 2015.

Early life and education 
Wills was born and raised in Sibley, Iowa. He earned a Bachelor of Science degree in biology from Northwestern College and two master's degrees from American Military University.

Career 
, Wills serves on the Human Resources, Natural Resources, and State Government committees, as well as the Agriculture and Natural Resources Appropriations Subcommittee. He also serves as the vice chair of the Environmental Protection Committee.

Wills is a founding member of Pheasants Forever in Osceola County and a member of the State Pheasants Forever Council. He is also a member of the Friends of Lakeside Lab and Veterans of Foreign War.

Wills is a former vice president of the Okoboji Protective Association and has been involved in water quality and conservation organizations for more than 15 years. Wills has served in the military for 25 years, including in the Army National Guard.

References

External links 

 Representative John Wills official Iowa General Assembly site
 Profile at Iowa House Republicans

|-

1966 births
21st-century American politicians
Living people
Republican Party members of the Iowa House of Representatives
People from Dickinson County, Iowa
People from Spirit Lake, Iowa